Trinity Episcopal Church is a historic church on Capitol Square in Downtown Columbus, Ohio. It was built in 1866 and added to the National Register of Historic Places in 1976.

The church features "The Church in the World", a stained glass window featuring Columbus landmarks and installed in 1965. Items depicted include a former Columbus flag, Ohio Stadium, the Ohio Statehouse, the LeVeque Tower, John Glenn Columbus International Airport, the Main Library and the statue of Christopher Columbus formerly at City Hall.

The church's adjoining parish house was designed by Howell & Thomas and built in 1910. Another story was added to the parish house in 1976.

See also
 National Register of Historic Places listings in Columbus, Ohio

References

External links

 Official website

Episcopal churches in Ohio
Churches on the National Register of Historic Places in Ohio
National Register of Historic Places in Columbus, Ohio
Gothic Revival church buildings in Ohio
Churches completed in 1866
Churches in Columbus, Ohio
Buildings in downtown Columbus, Ohio
19th-century Episcopal church buildings
1866 establishments in Ohio
Columbus Register properties
Broad Street (Columbus, Ohio)